Kiewa is a locality in north east Victoria, Australia.
 

Facilities include a general store and a state primary school.

References

External links

Towns in Victoria (Australia)
Shire of Indigo